Ernest Udeh Jr. is an American college basketball player for the Kansas Jayhawks of the Big 12 Conference.

Early life and high school career
Udeh grew up in Orlando, Florida and attended Dr. Phillips High School. He averaged 10.1 points, 9.8 rebounds, and 1.9 blocks per game as a junior as Dr. Phillips won the Class 7A state championship. Udeh averaged 13.1 points and 9.2 rebounds per game during his senior season. He played in the 2022 McDonald's All-American Boys Game. Udeh was rated a four-star recruit and committed to play college basketball at Kansas over offers from UCLA, Alabama, Arkansas, and Baylor.

College career
Udeh enrolled at Kansas shortly after graduating high school and took part in the Jayhawks' summer practices. He made his collegiate debut in Kansas's season opener against Omaha and scored five points with five rebounds and one block in over 14 minutes.

References

External links
Kansas Jayhawks bio

Living people
American men's basketball players
Basketball players from Florida
Centers (basketball)
Kansas Jayhawks men's basketball players
McDonald's High School All-Americans